Foxton may refer to:

Places
New Zealand
 Foxton, New Zealand, in the North Island
 Foxton Fizz, soft drink
 Foxton (New Zealand electorate), a former parliamentary electorate, 1881–1890
 Foxton Beach, North Island

United Kingdom
 Foxton, Cambridgeshire, England
 Foxton, County Durham, England
 Foxton, Leicestershire, England
 Foxton, North Yorkshire, England
 Foxton Locks, on the Grand Union Canal, in Leicestershire, England

United States
 Foxton, Colorado

People
 Bruce Foxton (born 1955), British musician
 David Foxton (born 1965), British judge
 John Foxton (1769–1829), British hangman
 Justin Foxton (1849–1916), Australian politician
 Richard Foxton (died 1649), British MP

See also 
Foxtons, estate agent based in London